Dương Kinh is an urban district (quận) of Hai Phong, the third largest city of Vietnam.

Districts of Haiphong